Yankeetown is an unincorporated community in the town of Clayton, Crawford County, Wisconsin, United States, approximately two miles southwest of Soldiers Grove, Wisconsin on Wisconsin Highway 131.

History
The cemetery there (still extant) was established around 1861; it is the oldest in the town of Clayton. In 1870 there was a schoolhouse there, which was used for services by a newly organized congregation of the Disciples of Christ.

William Henry Evans, a farmer, lawyer, and member of the Wisconsin State Assembly, lived in Yankeetown.

The Yankeetown post office ceased to be listed in the Wisconsin Blue Book as of the 1883 edition.

Notes

Unincorporated communities in Crawford County, Wisconsin
Unincorporated communities in Wisconsin